Perth Amboy is a city in Middlesex County, in the U.S. state of New Jersey. Perth Amboy is part of the New York metropolitan area. As of the 2020 United States census, the city's population was 55,436, an increase of 4,622 (+9.1%) from the 2010 census count of 50,814, which in turn reflected an increase of 3,511 (+7.4%) from the 47,303 counted in the 2000 census. Perth Amboy has a Hispanic majority population. In the 2010 census, the Hispanic population made up 78.1% of the population, the second-highest in the state, behind Union City at 84.7%. Perth Amboy is known as the "City by the Bay", referring to its location adjoining Raritan Bay. The Census Bureau's Population Estimates Program calculated that the city's population was 55,291 in 2021, ranking the city as the 719th-most-populous in the country.

The earliest residents of the area were the Lenape Native Americans, who called the point on which the city lies "Ompoge". Perth Amboy was settled in 1683 by Scottish colonists and was called "New Perth" after James Drummond, 4th Earl of Perth; the native name was eventually corrupted and the two names were merged. Perth Amboy was formed by Royal charter in 1718, and the New Jersey Legislature reaffirmed its status in 1784, after independence. The city was a capital of the Province of New Jersey from 1686 to 1776. During the mid-1800s, the Industrial Revolution and immigration grew the city, developing a variety of neighborhoods which residents from a diverse range of ethnicities lived in. The city developed into a resort town for the Raritan Bayshore near it, but the city has grown in other industries since its redevelopment starting in the 1990s.

Perth Amboy borders the Arthur Kill and features a historic waterfront. The Perth Amboy Ferry Slip was once an important ferry slip on the route south from New York City; it was added to the National Register of Historic Places in 1978. The Raritan Yacht Club, one of the oldest yacht clubs in the United States, is located in the city. Perth Amboy is connected to the Staten Island borough of New York City via the Outerbridge Crossing.

History

Name
The Lenape Native Americans called the point on which the city is built "Ompoge", meaning "level ground" or "standing or upright". When settled in 1683, the new city was dubbed "New Perth" in honor of James Drummond, Earl of Perth, one of the 12 associates of a company of Scottish proprietors; Drummond has been honored with a statue located outside of city hall. The Algonquian language name persisted, corrupted to Ambo, or Point Amboy, and eventually a combination of the native and colonial names emerged,  also appearing in South Amboy.

Scottish colony
Perth Amboy was settled by Scottish colonists around 1683 who had been recruited to inhabit the share of the East Jersey colony owned by Robert Barclay, a Quaker who would later become the absentee governor of the province.

Charter and incorporation
Perth Amboy was formed by Royal charter on August 4, 1718, within various townships and again by New Jersey Legislature on December 21, 1784, within Perth Amboy Township and from part of Woodbridge Township. Perth Amboy Township was formed on October 31, 1693, and was enlarged during the 1720s to encompass Perth Amboy city. Perth Amboy Township was incorporated as one of New Jersey's initial 104 townships through the Township Act of 1798 on February 21, 1798. The township was replaced by Perth Amboy city on April 8, 1844.

Provincial capital

Elizabeth (then known as Elizabethtown) was designated in 1668 as the first capital of New Jersey.  In 1686, Perth Amboy was designated as the capital of East Jersey, while Burlington was the capital of West Jersey. After the two were united as a royal colony in 1702, the two cities alternated as the capital of the Province of New Jersey until November 1790, when Trenton was designated as the unified state capital, chosen based on its location midway between New York City and Philadelphia.

A few of the buildings from this early period can still be seen today. Most notably, the Proprietary House, the home of William Franklin, the last Royal Governor of New Jersey and estranged son of Benjamin Franklin, still stands in the waterfront area of the city. Architect John Edward Pryor was hired in 1761 to design and construct the building, which was completed in September 1764, years late and over budget. Franklin preferred his alternate home in Burlington. Franklin finally moved in 1774 into the Proprietary House. Franklin's father, Ben, tried unsuccessfully to convince his son to support the Colonial cause. William Franklin was arrested and detained at Proprietary House in 1776 until he was tried and convicted of treason.

Perth Amboy City Hall was first built as a court house for Middlesex County in 1714, having been designated as the county seat the previous year. The building was later used as the home of the East Jersey Provincial Assembly. The building was destroyed by a major fire in 1731 and rebuilt in 1745. Another fire was deliberately set in 1764, forcing a rebuilding that was completed in 1767. It is the oldest city hall in continuous use in the United States. On November 20, 1789, City Hall was the site where the New Jersey General Assembly met to ratify the Bill of Rights, becoming the first state in the nation to do so.

Market Square, located across from City Hall, is a park that had been an outdoor marketplace during the Colonial era. Market Square includes a replica of the Liberty Bell, a statue of George Washington and the Bill of Rights Arch, which commemorates the fact that New Jersey was the first state to ratify the Bill of Rights.

St. Peter's Church, which held its first service in 1685 and received a royal charter in 1718, has been recognized as the first Episcopal congregation in the state. Its current building, dating from the 1850s, is surrounded by a graveyard of early inhabitants and displays a collection of stained-glass windows with religious scenes as well as early depictions of New Jersey receiving her charter and a meeting between William Franklin and his father, Ben.

Perth Amboy was New Jersey's primary inbound port for African slaves.

The Kearny Cottage is a remaining example of 18th-century vernacular architecture. Operated as a historic house museum and operated by the Kearny Cottage Historical Society. Built in 1781 on High Street, the house was moved to Sadowski Parkway in the 1920s, and was later relocated to its current site at 63 Catalpa Avenue, just inland from the mouth of the Raritan River.

During the colonial period and for a significant time thereafter, Perth Amboy was an important way-station for travelers between New York City and Philadelphia, as it was the site of a ferry that crossed the Arthur Kill to Tottenville, Staten Island. The first ferry operated in 1684 and regular service began operating in 1709. This ferry became less important when the Outerbridge Crossing opened in 1928, but continued to operate until 1963. In 1998, the Perth Amboy Ferry Slip was restored to its 1904 appearance. A replica of the ticket office has been constructed and is used as a small museum.

On March 31, 1870, Thomas Mundy Peterson became the first African-American in the United States to vote in an election under the recently enacted provisions of the Fifteenth Amendment to the United States Constitution. Peterson voted in an election to update the Perth Amboy city charter.

Industrialization and immigration

By the middle of the 19th century, immigration and industrialization transformed Perth Amboy. Factories such as A. Hall and Sons Terra Cotta, Guggenheim and Sons and the Copper Works Smelting Company fueled a thriving downtown and employed many area residents. Growth was further stimulated by becoming the tidewater terminal for the Lehigh Valley Railroad and a coal shipping point. Perth Amboy developed tightly-knit and insular ethnic neighborhoods such as Budapest, Dublin, and Chickentown. Immigrants from Denmark, Poland, Hungary, Czechoslovakia, Italy, Russia, and Austria quickly dominated the factory jobs.

In 1903, the Perth Amboy Public Library, one of the first Carnegie libraries in the state, made possible through grants from Andrew Carnegie and donations by local philanthropists, opened to the public.

In 1914, Perth Amboy hosted a minor league baseball team called the Perth Amboy Pacers, who played as members of the Class D level Atlantic League. The Atlantic League folded after one season.

In late August 1923, an estimated 6,000 persons rioted, breaking through police lines after the Ku Klux Klan attempted to organize a meeting in the city.

The city was a resort town in the 19th century and early 20th century, located on the northern edge of the Raritan Bayshore. Since the early 1990s Perth Amboy has seen redevelopment. Small businesses have started to open up, helped by the city's designation as an Urban Enterprise Zone. The waterfront has also seen a rebirth. The marina has been extended, and there are new promenades, parks, and housing overlooking the bay.

The chapter "More Alarms at Night" in humorist James Thurber's biography My Life and Hard Times involves Perth Amboy. One night during his adolescence in Ohio, young Thurber is unable to go to sleep because he cannot remember the name of this New Jersey community. He wakens his father, demanding that he start naming towns in New Jersey. When the startled father names several towns with single-word names, Thurber replies that the name he is seeking is "two words, like helter skelter". This convinces his father that Thurber has become dangerously insane. Thurber also wrote the story later made into the film The Secret Life of Walter Mitty, about an "inconsequential guy from Perth Amboy, New Jersey". Perth Amboy's water pumping station is located in Old Bridge Township.

Geography
According to the U.S. Census Bureau, the city had a total area of 5.93 square miles (15.36 km2), including 4.66 square miles (12.07 km2) of land and 1.27 square miles (3.28 km2) of water (21.37%).

Perth Amboy, and South Amboy across the Raritan River, are collectively referred to as The Amboys. Signage for Exit 11 on the New Jersey Turnpike refers to "The Amboys" as a destination. The Amboys are the northern limit of the area informally referred to as the Bayshore.

Perth Amboy borders Woodbridge (adjacent by land to the north and west), Sayreville (to the southwest, across the Raritan River), South Amboy (south across the upper reaches of Raritan Bay, directly connected only by rail), and the New York City borough of Staten Island (east across the Arthur Kill).

Unincorporated communities, localities and place names located partially or completely within the city include Barber, Eagleswood and Florida Grove.

Perth Amboy sits on a geological layer of clay several hundred feet thick. Consequently, clay mining and factories such as A. Hall and Sons Terra Cotta located in Perth Amboy in the late 19th century.

In its September 2005 issue, Golf Magazine named Perth Amboy the unofficial "Golf Capital of the U.S.", despite the fact that there are no golf courses within the city limits, citing the city's access to 25 of the magazine's Top 100 Golf Courses in the U.S., which can be found within  of Perth Amboy.

Waterfront
Perth Amboy features a historic waterfront, which has gone through significant revitalization. Local attractions include the Perth Amboy Ferry Slip, two small museums, an art gallery, a yacht club, and a marina. Near the marina lies a park with a small bandshell. On Sunday afternoons in the summertime, Perth Amboy hosts the Concerts by the Bay in the park's bandshell. Every Thursday evening in the summer, Perth Amboy hosts the Mayor's Concert Series in Bayview Park. Perth Amboy also hosts an annual Waterfront Arts Festival. The waterfront is also characterized by a redbrick promenade near the water and many stately Victorian homes, some on hills overlooking the bay and tree lined streets with well-manicured lawns. The land rises steeply after two blocks. This hides the rest of the town, making the waterfront look like a quiet fishing village. Points of interest on the waterfront include St. Peter's Episcopal Church, and the Proprietary House, which is now the former governor's mansion and houses a museum and some offices. Kearny Cottage, which also has a museum, is here. This section of Perth Amboy once had a thriving Jewish community with yeshivas, synagogues, kosher butchers and bakers. Today, however, there are only two synagogues left, each with only a few older members.

A project called 'The Landings at Harborside' was to have featured 2,100 residential units along with indoor parking,  of retail space, a community center, and recreation amenities for the public as well. However, after meeting with Charles Kushner, the developer who spent two years in prison after being convicted of witness tampering, tax evasion and making illegal campaign contributions, Mayor Wilda Diaz endorsed a scaled-back design concept for the development, allowing Section 8 housing rentals instead of owner-occupied units as originally promised.

The Raritan Yacht Club is the state's second-oldest and one of the oldest yacht clubs in the United States, founded in 1882 from the merger of two older clubs, one founded in 1865 and the other in 1874. Also located on the waterfront and founded in 1917, St. Demetrios was one of the first Greek Orthodox churches in central New Jersey. Established by the Greek immigrants who came to the United States at the turn of the 19th century, this community has stood as a beacon of the Orthodox Faith and Hellenism in Middlesex County.

Downtown Perth Amboy

Perth Amboy was settled by Europeans in 1683 and incorporated as a city in 1718. It was founded by English merchants, Scots seeking religious freedom, and French Protestants, who sought to make use of Perth Amboy's harbor to its full potential. Downtown is the main commercial district, and is centered on Smith Street. It is an Urban Enterprise Zone, and the reduced sales tax rate (half of the statewide rate) funds revitalization of Smith Street with newly planted trees, Victorian streetlights, benches, garbage cans, and redbrick sidewalks. Smith Street is a shopping center seven blocks wide, with stores catering to working-class customers. The street is flanked by mainly two- to three-story buildings of varied architecture. It also has a lone bank skyscraper called 'Amboy Towers', 10 stories tall, located at Five Corners, the intersection of Smith Street, New Brunswick Avenue and State Street. Once home to several department stores downtown, the largest today is discount retailer Bargain Man.

Harbortown

Harbortown is a townhouse development on the waterfront which continues to be expanded since construction started in 1987. "Section 8" housing along with more affluent homes can be found in Harbortown, an economically and ethnically diverse townhouse development in the city.

This area was the Lehigh Valley Railroad marshaling yards where coal was loaded onto barges for shipment to New York City and elsewhere until the LVRR went bankrupt in 1976.

Hall Avenue
Hall Avenue is a neighborhood centered on Hall Avenue east of the NJ Transit train tracks. The street itself, Hall Avenue, is no longer the commercial strip it once was. However, there is a recently built strip mall on the corner of Hall Avenue and State Street called the "Firehouse Plaza". There is also a "Banco Popular" branch of the bank headquartered in Puerto Rico. However, Hall Avenue is now primarily residential. Most of the homes are aging apartments, but there are also some newly constructed homes. Hall Avenue remains a traditional Puerto Rican neighborhood, and it hosts the city's annual Puerto Rican Day Festival, which is held on the same day of the historic Puerto Rican Day Parade in New York City. Rudyk Park is north of Route 440 and features the Roberto Clemente Baseball Field and an industrial park.

Southwestern section
The southwestern section is a mainly working-class residential neighborhood with some light industry, once the site of Eagleswood Military Academy. The city's largest strip mall is located here. This neighborhood has a large and diversified Hispanic neighborhood with many Dominicans, Puerto Ricans, and recently, South Americans. Much of the city's Mexican population also lives in this section. Previously, this section of Perth Amboy had a large Irish population and was once named "Dublin". Following the Irish came the Eastern Europeans, primarily Polish and Hungarian. Most of the housing consists of small one- or two-family houses. The main commercial strip is Smith Street, west of the NJ Transit train tracks.

Western section
The western section of the waterfront is west of Kearny Avenue. It is an overwhelmingly blue-collar Hispanic neighborhood. Most of the homes are over 100 years old; many are modest row houses. Sadowski Parkway Park lines through the southern end of the neighborhood and has a walkway with a beach. The park also hosts the Dominican festival and other festivals during the summer.

State Street

State Street is a neighborhood east of the NJ Transit train tracks, north of Fayette Street, and south of Harbortown. Like the southwestern section of Perth Amboy, it is predominantly working-class Hispanic. In addition, this neighborhood had many industries and factories before they moved overseas. The neighborhood is mainly Caribbean Hispanic. This section once had a large Cuban community. The State and Fayette Gardens, an apartment complex in the neighborhood, were called "The Cuban Buildings" at one time. The Landings at Harborside redevelopment project is being constructed in this neighborhood.

Amboy Avenue
Amboy Avenue is a quasi-suburban, working to middle-class neighborhood. It is also referred to as the "Hospital section" or the "High School section" due to the fact that these places are located in the neighborhood. Today most residents are Hispanic; Amboy Avenue once had a strong Italian population.

Maurer
Maurer is a chiefly working to middle-class neighborhood that lies in the northern part of Route 440. It is heavily industrial with many oil refineries and brownfields. Like Amboy Avenue, it is quasi-suburban.

Chickentown
Chickentown is a neighborhood in the western part of Route 35 south of Spa Springs, just south of Route 440. It shares many of the same characteristics of Spa Springs but to a lesser extent. The city's largest park, Washington Park, is located here. It received its name from all the chicken farms (hens and eggs) that were located here before World War II.

Climate
Perth Amboy has a humid subtropical climate (Köppen climate classification Cfa) typical of New Jersey with hot, humid summers and cold, wet winters.

Demographics

The city is one of many U.S. communities with a majority Hispanic population.

2010 census

The Census Bureau's 2006–2010 American Community Survey showed that (in 2010 inflation-adjusted dollars) median household income was $47,696 (with a margin of error of +/− $3,644) and the median family income was $53,792 (+/− $2,943). Males had a median income of $38,485 (+/− $2,450) versus $30,078 (+/− $3,452) for females. The per capita income for the city was $20,162 (+/− $933). About 16.3% of families and 19.4% of the population were below the poverty line, including 28.8% of those under age 18 and 15.2% of those age 65 or over.

2000 census
As of the 2000 United States census there were 47,303 people, 14,562 households, and 10,761 families residing in the city. The population density was 9,892.0 people per square mile (3,820.9/km2). There were 15,236 housing units at an average density of 3,186.2 per square mile (1,230.7/km2). The racial makeup of the city was 46.41% White, 10.04% African American, 0.70% Native American, 1.53% Asian, 0.13% Pacific Islander, 35.59% from other races, and 5.61% from two or more races. Hispanic or Latino of any race were 69.83% of the population.

There were 14,562 households, out of which 40.3% had children under the age of 18 living with them, 44.6% were married couples living together, 21.0% had a female householder with no husband present, and 26.1% were non-families. 20.6% of all households were made up of individuals, and 8.8% had someone living alone who was 65 years of age or older. The average household size was 3.20 and the average family size was 3.63.

In the city the population was spread out, with 28.5% under the age of 18, 11.4% from 18 to 24, 31.6% from 25 to 44, 18.3% from 45 to 64, and 10.2% who were 65 years of age or older. The median age was 31 years. For every 100 females, there were 98.2 males. For every 100 females age 18 and over, there were 94.8 males.

The median income for a household in the city was $37,608, and the median income for a family was $40,740. Males had a median income of $29,399 versus $21,954 for females. The per capita income for the city was $14,989. About 14.3% of families and 17.6% of the population were below the poverty line, including 24.1% of those under age 18 and 12.8% of those age 65 or over.

In 2000, 27.79% of Perth Amboy residents identified themselves as being of Puerto Rican ancestry, the fifth highest concentration of Puerto Ricans on the U.S. mainland of those municipalities with 1,000 or more residents identifying their ancestry. In the same census, 18.81% of Perth Amboy residents identified themselves as being of Dominican ancestry, the third highest concentration in the country of Dominicans in the United States after Haverstraw, New York and Lawrence, Massachusetts using the same criteria.

Economy
Portions of the city are part of an Urban Enterprise Zone (UEZ), one of 32 zones covering 37 municipalities statewide. The city was selected in 1994 as one of a group of 10 zones added to participate in the program. In addition to other benefits to encourage employment within the UEZ, shoppers can take advantage of a reduced 3.3125% sales tax rate (half of the % rate charged statewide) at eligible merchants. Established in October 1994, the city's Urban Enterprise Zone status expires in October 2025.

Government

Local government

The City of Perth Amboy is governed under the Mayor-Council system of municipal government under the Faulkner Act. The city is one of 71 municipalities (of the 564) statewide governed under this form. The governing body is comprised of the Mayor and the City Council, all of whom are elected at-large on a non-partisan basis. The city council is comprised of five members who are elected to four-year terms of office on a staggered basis, with either two or three seats coming up for election in alternating even-numbered years. The mayor also serves a four-year term of office, which is up for election the same year that two council seats are up for vote. In October 2010, the City Council voted to shift the city's non-partisan elections from May to November, with the first balloting held in conjunction with the General Election in November 2012.

, the mayor of Perth Amboy is Helmin J. Caba, whose term of office ends December 31, 2024. Caba defeated former three-term mayor Wilda Diaz who had served 12 years in office from 2008 to 2020. After trailing behind incumbent mayor Wilda Diaz by 33%-30% (a margin of more than 400 votes) in the November 2020 general election, he won the mayoral runoff election against Wilda Diaz on December 15, 2020. Members of the City Council are Rose B. Morales (2024), Joel Pabon Sr. (2022), William A. Petrick (2022), Milady Tejeda (2022) and Bienvenido "BJ" Torres (2024).

In the November 2014 general election, Fernando Gonzalez came in third place, winning the final seat up for election ahead of Sergio Diaz by nine votes. In March 2015, a Superior Court judge ordered a special election between Diaz and Gonzalez after finding that votes had been illegally cast and that there was evidence of fraud in mail voting. In the special election, Gonzalez beat Diaz by a 112-vote margin.

Federal, state and county representation
Perth Amboy is located in the 6th Congressional District and is part of New Jersey's 19th state legislative district.

 

Middlesex County is governed by a Board of County Commissioners, whose seven members are elected at-large on a partisan basis to serve three-year terms of office on a staggered basis, with either two or three seats coming up for election each year as part of the November general election. At an annual reorganization meeting held in January, the board selects from among its members a commissioner director and deputy director. , Middlesex County's Commissioners (with party affiliation, term-end year, and residence listed in parentheses) are 
Commissioner Director Ronald G. Rios (D, Carteret, term as commissioner ends December 31, 2024; term as commissioner director ends 2022),
Commissioner Deputy Director Shanti Narra (D, North Brunswick, term as commissioner ends 2024; term as deputy director ends 2022),
Claribel A. "Clary" Azcona-Barber (D, New Brunswick, 2022),
Charles Kenny (D, Woodbridge Township, 2022),
Leslie Koppel (D, Monroe Township, 2023),
Chanelle Scott McCullum (D, Piscataway, 2024) and 
Charles E. Tomaro (D, Edison, 2023).
Constitutional officers are
County Clerk Nancy Pinkin (D, 2025, East Brunswick),
Sheriff Mildred S. Scott (D, 2022, Piscataway) and 
Surrogate Claribel Cortes (D, 2026; North Brunswick).

Politics
As of March 2011, there were a total of 22,737 registered voters in Perth Amboy, of which 9,212 (40.5%) were registered as Democrats, 1,022 (4.5%) were registered as Republicans and 12,500 (55.0%) were registered as Unaffiliated. There were 3 voters registered to either the Libertarian Party or the Green Party.

In the 2012 presidential election, Democrat Barack Obama received 87.0% of the vote (11,774 cast), ahead of Republican Mitt Romney with 12.3% (1,667 votes), and other candidates with 0.7% (100 votes), among the 13,869 ballots cast by the city's 24,253 registered voters (328 ballots were spoiled), for a turnout of 57.2%. In the 2008 presidential election, Democrat Barack Obama received 81.6% of the vote (10,999 cast), ahead of Republican John McCain with 16.8% (2,261 votes) and other candidates with 0.7% (91 votes), among the 13,473 ballots cast by the city's 23,248 registered voters, for a turnout of 58.0%. In the 2004 presidential election, Democrat John Kerry received 71.0% of the vote (8,677 ballots cast), outpolling Republican George W. Bush with 27.5% (3,359 votes) and other candidates with 0.4% (79 votes), among the 12,223 ballots cast by the city's 21,686 registered voters, for a turnout percentage of 56.4.

In the 2013 gubernatorial election, Democrat Barbara Buono received 63.1% of the vote (3,574 cast), ahead of Republican Chris Christie with 35.6% (2,014 votes), and other candidates with 1.3% (74 votes), among the 5,915 ballots cast by the city's 24,593 registered voters (253 ballots were spoiled), for a turnout of 24.1%. In the 2009 gubernatorial election, Democrat Jon Corzine received 69.8% of the vote (4,645 ballots cast), ahead of Republican Chris Christie with 24.2% (1,611 votes), Independent Chris Daggett with 3.4% (228 votes) and other candidates with 0.8% (50 votes), among the 6,654 ballots cast by the city's 22,185 registered voters, yielding a 30.0% turnout.

Transportation

Roads and highways

The city is crisscrossed by many many major roads and highways. Major roads in the city include Route 35 Route 184, Route 440, CR 501 and CR 616.

The Outerbridge Crossing, which opened to traffic on June 29, 1928, is a cantilever bridge over the Arthur Kill that connects Perth Amboy with Staten Island. Known locally as the "Outerbridge", it is part of a major route on NY-440 / NJ-440 from the south and west to New York City and Long Island. Despite the assumption that the name is derived from its location as the southernmost bridge in New York State and Staten Island, the Outerbridge Crossing was named in honor of Eugenius H. Outerbridge, first Chairman of the Port Authority.

The Victory Bridge carries Route 35 over the Raritan River, connecting Perth Amboy on the north with Sayreville to the south. From the time of its construction in 1926 until the Edison Bridge was completed in 1939, all traffic heading across the Raritan River was funneled through the Victory Bridge, whose original single-span swing bridge was replaced under a project completed in 2005 that provides two spans of traffic, including a  main span that was the longest precast cantilever segmental construction in the United States at the time of its construction.

Public transportation
The city has NJ Transit train service at Perth Amboy station. The station provides service on the North Jersey Coast Line to Newark Penn Station, Hoboken Terminal, Secaucus Junction, New York Penn Station and the Jersey Shore.

NJ Transit buses serve the Port Authority Bus Terminal on the 116 route, Elizabeth on the 48 line, with local service available on the 813, 815, and 817 bus routes.

Bicycle regulation
Since 1939, legal use of a bicycle in Perth Amboy requires a license issued by the Perth Amboy police department. The purchase and sale of used bicycles must be reported to the Perth Amboy police department. Any person operating a business engaged in the sale or purchase of new or used bicycles must file a daily report with the Chief of Police detailing the particulars of all transactions.  There is at least one bicycle shop in Perth Amboy.

Education

Public schools in Perth Amboy are operated by Perth Amboy Public Schools, serving students in pre-kindergarten through twelfth grade. The district is one of 31 former Abbott districts statewide that were established pursuant to the decision by the New Jersey Supreme Court in Abbott v. Burke which are now referred to as "SDA Districts" based on the requirement for the state to cover all costs for school building and renovation projects in these districts under the supervision of the New Jersey Schools Development Authority.

As of the 2020–21 school year, the district, comprised of 12 schools, had an enrollment of 10,786 students and 898.7 classroom teachers (on an FTE basis), for a student–teacher ratio of 12.0:1. Schools in the district (with 2020–21 enrollment data from the National Center for Education Statistics) are 
Ignacio Cruz Early Childhood Center (667 students; in (Pre-K), 
Edmund Hmieleski Jr. Early Childhood Center (362; Pre-K), 
School #7 Early Childhood Center (NA; Pre-K), 
Anthony V. Ceres Elementary School (581; K–4), 
James J. Flynn Elementary School (550; K–4), 
Rose M. Lopez Elementary School (812; K–3), 
Edward J. Patten Elementary Elementary School (660; K–4), 
Dr. Herbert N. Richardson 21st Century Elementary School (491; K–4), 
Robert N. Wilentz Elementary School (637; K–4), 
Dual Language School (397; 4–8), 
William C. McGinnis Middle School (1,398; 5–8), 
Samuel E. Shull Middle School (1,410; 5–8) and 
Perth Amboy High School (2,547; 9–12).

Based on data from the 2013–2017 American Community Survey, 14.5% of adults over the age of 25 in Perth Amboy have a bachelor's degree or higher, a percentage significantly below the state average of 38.9% and the 42.7% of those in Middlesex County.

The Academy for Urban Leadership Charter High School is a public high school serving grades 7–12 open since September 2010, operating independently of the Perth Amboy Public Schools under the terms of a charter granted by the New Jersey Department of Education. The school opened with one hundred 9th graders, with plans to add a class of 100 students each year until it reached its goal of 400 students in grades 9–12 by the 2013–2014 school year and has since added grades 7 and 8. As of the 2017–2018 school year, the school had an enrollment of 576 students and 49.0 classroom teachers (on an FTE basis), for a student–teacher ratio of 11.8:1.

Eighth grade students from all of Middlesex County are eligible to apply to attend the high school programs offered by the Middlesex County Vocational and Technical Schools, a county-wide vocational school district that offers full-time career and technical education at Middlesex County Academy in Edison, the Academy for Allied Health and Biomedical Sciences in Woodbridge and at its East Brunswick, Perth Amboy and Piscataway technical high schools, with no tuition charged to students for attendance.

Assumption Catholic School (Pre-K–8) and Perth Amboy Catholic Primary School / Upper School (Pre-K–8) operate under the supervision of Roman Catholic Diocese of Metuchen.

In 1903, the Perth Amboy Public Library became the first Carnegie library in the state, made possible through a grant of $20,000 from Andrew Carnegie Foundation and donations from local philanthropists, which were supplemented in 1914 by an additional $30,000 in Carnegie grants to pay for two additional reading rooms. The library reopened in 2015 after a $2 million renovation project that kept the library closed for more than two years.

Notable people

People who were born in, residents of, or otherwise closely associated with Perth Amboy include:

 Soren Sorensen Adams (1879–1963), inventor and manufacturer of novelty products, including the joy buzzer
 Garth Ancier (born 1957), media executive best known for being one of only two people to have programmed three of the five US broadcast television networks
 Solomon Andrews (1806–1872), creator of the first successful dirigible airship; served three terms as mayor of Perth Amboy
 Carolyn Aronson (born 1966), hair care entrepreneur
 Mike Baumgartner (1922–1991), bobsledder who competed in the Four-man event at the 1964 Winter Olympics
 Jay Bellamy (born 1972), safety who played in the NFL for the Seattle Seahawks and the New Orleans Saints
 Jon Bon Jovi (born 1962), singer was born in Perth Amboy
 Padi Boyd, astrophysicist who is the head of NASA's Exoplanets and Stellar Astrophysics Laboratory
 Kelly J. Breen (born 1969), trainer of thoroughbred racehorses
 Malcolm Brenner (born 1951), author, journalist and zoophile
 Miles Browning (1897–1954), officer in the United States Navy in the Atlantic during World War I and in the Pacific during World War II who was a pioneer in the development of aircraft carrier combat operations concepts
 Frank Buckiewicz (1930–2017), football player and coach who served as the head football coach at Pacific University from 1965 to 1980
 Johnny Buff (1888–1955), boxer who was world bantamweight champion from 1921 to 1922
 Anne Casale (1930–2002, class of 1948), cookbook author and cooking teacher
 Karen A. Cerulo (born 1957), sociologist specializing in the study of culture, communication and cognition
 Alan Cheuse (1940–2015), writer
 Steve Christiansen (born 1956), rower who competed in the men's eight event at the 1976 Summer Olympics
 Stanley Norman Cohen (born 1935), co-creator of the first genetically modified organism and the process of recombinant DNA technology
 Craig Coughlin (born 1958), politician who has represented the 19th Legislative District in the New Jersey General Assembly since 2010 and has served as the Speaker of the General Assembly since 2018
 Flora Parker DeHaven (1883–1950), actress and mother of actress Gloria DeHaven
 Thomas J. Deverin (1921–2010), politician who served 11 terms in the New Jersey General Assembly, from 1970 to 1992
 William Dunlap (1766–1839), theater pioneer
 Bernard J. Dwyer (1921–1998, class of 1938), politician, who served in the United States House of Representatives from New Jersey from 1981 to 1993
 Walt Flanagan (born 1967), comic book artist and podcaster, creator of One True Three
 William Franklin (1730–1813), last governor of Province of New Jersey
 Arthur Franz (1920–2006), actor
 Thomas Gordon (1652–1722), lawyer who served as Chief Justice of the New Jersey Supreme Court and New Jersey Attorney General for the Province of New Jersey
 Angelina Grimké (1805–1879) and Sarah Grimké (1792–1873), abolitionists
 Vida Guerra (born 1974), model, was born in Cuba but was raised in Perth Amboy
 Gene Hubka (1924–2017), American football tailback who played for the Pittsburgh Steelers.
 George Inness (1825–1894), landscape painter
 Augustus Johnston (1729–1790), Rhode Island Attorney General, Tory sympathizer
 Lewis B. Kaden, businessman, attorney, legal scholar, and former political advisor who served as vice chairman of Citigroup from 2005 to 2013
 Lawrence Kearny (1789–1868), the "Sailor Diplomat", who paved the way for an open-door policy with China
 Edward L. Kemeys (1843–1907), sculptor in residence at Eagleswood Mansion
 Morgan Foster Larson (1882–1961), Governor of New Jersey from 1929 to 1932
 Yvonne Lopez (born 1957), politician who has represented the 19th Legislative District in the New Jersey General Assembly since 2018
 Miilkbone (born 1974 as Thomas Wlodarczyk), rapper
 Walter Mitty, fictional character from the 1947 film The Secret Life of Walter Mitty
 Steve Mizerak (1944–2006), champion pool player
 Joseph Montani (PAHS, 1970), astronomer and planetary scientist who named the minor planet "12465 Perth Amboy" after his hometown
 John A. Nagy (1946–2016), author of books about espionage and mutinies of the American Revolution
 George Otlowski (1912–2009), politician who served as mayor of the city from 1976 to 1990
 Thomas H. Paterniti (1929–2017), dentist and politician who served as Mayor of Edison and in both houses of the New Jersey Legislature
 Edward J. Patten (1905–1994), lawyer and politician who represented New Jersey's 15th congressional district in the United States House of Representatives from 1963 until 1981
 Will Pennyfeather (born 1968), former center fielder for the Pittsburgh Pirates
 Thomas Mundy Peterson (1824–1904), first African-American to vote under the provisions of the 15th Amendment to the U.S. constitution in 1870
 Joseph J. Sadowski (1917–1944), United States Army soldier awarded the Medal of Honor for his actions in World War II
 Richie Sambora (born 1959), guitarist for Bon Jovi was born here
 Arthur J. Sills (1917–1982), attorney who served as New Jersey Attorney General from 1962 to 1970
 Dave Smigelsky (born 1959), former American football punter who played for the Atlanta Falcons of the National Football League and Washington Federals of the United States Football League
 Joann H. Smith (1934–1998), politician who served in the New Jersey General Assembly from the 13th Legislative District from 1986 to 1998
 Marcus Spring (1810–1874), founder of Raritan Bay Union and Eagleswood Military Academy
 Steve Stanko (1917–1978), heavyweight weightlifter and bodybuilder who was crowned Mr. America in 1944 and Mr. Universe in 1947
 John Stevens (–1792), colonial American landowner, merchant and politician who was a delegate to the Continental Congress from New Jersey
 John Stevens (1749–1838), engineer who developed the multitubular boiler engine and the screw propeller
 Alec John Such (1951–2022), musician who was best known as a founding member of the rock band Bon Jovi, and as their bass player from 1983 to 1994
 Bruce Taylor (born 1948), former NFL player
 Brian Taylor (born 1951), former professional basketball player who played for the New York Nets and three other teams in his 10-year career in the NBA
 Harry Tierney (1890–1965), composer
 Marc Turtletaub (born 1946), movie producer and former president and CEO of The Money Store
 John Watson (1685–1768), one of the first painters in America and holder of the first gallery of paintings in the country
 Ruth White (1914–1969), Emmy Award winning television, stage and motion picture actress
 Amy Wilentz (born 1954), writer
 David T. Wilentz (1894–1988), N.J. Attorney General from 1934 to 1944, who prosecuted Bruno Hauptmann in the Lindbergh kidnapping trial
 Robert Wilentz (1927–1996), Chief Justice of New Jersey Supreme Court from 1979 to 1996
 Warren W. Wilentz (1924–2010), attorney and politician
 Blenda Wilson (born 1941), university president and education executive who was the first African-American woman to lead a large (over 25,000 students) university in the United States
 John Wisniewski (born 1962), politician who served in the New Jersey General Assembly from 1996 to 2018, where he represented the 19th Legislative District

Sister cities
  Caldas da Rainha, Portugal
  Hillsdale, Michigan

See also
ASARCO
King's Highway

References

External links

 
1683 establishments in New Jersey
Cities in Middlesex County, New Jersey
Faulkner Act (mayor–council)
New Jersey Urban Enterprise Zones
Populated places established in 1683
Port cities and towns in New Jersey
Scottish-American history
Jersey Shore communities in Middlesex County
Hispanic and Latino American culture in New Jersey